Roman Dąbrowski (born 14 March 1972), is a Polish former professional footballer. Dąbrowski is a naturalized Turkish citizen and thus also known as Kaan Dobra.

Honours
Beşiktaş J.K.
Süper Lig (1): 2002–03

Kocaelispor
Turkish Cup (2): 1996–97, 2001–02

External links
 
 

1972 births
Living people
People from Głuchołazy
Polish footballers
Poland international footballers
Ruch Chorzów players
Kocaelispor footballers
Antalyaspor footballers
Beşiktaş J.K. footballers
Ekstraklasa players
Süper Lig players
Polish expatriate footballers
Expatriate footballers in Turkey
Turkish people of Polish descent
Naturalized citizens of Turkey
Sportspeople from Opole Voivodeship

Association football wingers